The New Hope–Lambertville Toll Bridge carries U.S. Route 202 (US 202) over the Delaware River, connecting Delaware Township in Hunterdon County, New Jersey, with Solebury Township in Bucks County, Pennsylvania, United States. The bridge, which opened in 1971, was built and is currently operated by the Delaware River Joint Toll Bridge Commission. The commission is also responsible for maintenance and operation of the interchanges with Route 29 in New Jersey and Pennsylvania Route 32 (PA 32) on the Pennsylvania side.

History
The bridge, part of an $8 million project approved in 1967, opened on July 22, 1971, in ceremonies attended by Governor of New Jersey William T. Cahill. Following completion, the bridge was connected to local routes via temporary roads. Not until 1975 was US 202 realigned so as to incorporate the new toll bridge.

Structure
It is constructed with steel girders and a reinforced concrete deck. The bridge's piers are stone faced. The toll gate is located on the Pennsylvania approach. While the DRJTBC states that it has a total of 8 toll lanes, that number has shrunk to 4 toll lanes since the bridge was refurbished in 2003. This refurbishment replaced the old toll plaza with a new one, and it eliminated the toll lanes for those crossing into New Jersey.

Tolls

Tolls are collected Southbound (NJ to PA) at a 4-lane gate on the Pennsylvania side. There is no toll collected Northbound. 

As of April 11, 2021, the cash toll for automobiles is $3.00; cars with E-ZPass pay $1.25. Toll rates for trucks range from $9 to $35.

References

Delaware River Joint Toll Bridge Commission
1971 establishments in New Jersey
1971 establishments in Pennsylvania
Toll bridges in New Jersey
Toll bridges in Pennsylvania
Bridges in Hunterdon County, New Jersey
Bridges over the Delaware River
Bridges completed in 1971
Bridges in Bucks County, Pennsylvania
Road bridges in New Jersey
Road bridges in Pennsylvania
U.S. Route 202
Bridges of the United States Numbered Highway System
Steel bridges in the United States
Girder bridges in the United States
Interstate vehicle bridges in the United States